John Lynch (11 January 1927 – 4 April 2018) was Professor of Latin American History at the University of London. He spent most of his academic career at University College, and then from 1974 to 1987 as Director of the Institute of Latin American Studies. The main focus of his work was Spanish America in the period 1750–1850.

Life and education 

John Lynch was born on 11 January 1927 in Boldon, County Durham, in northern England. He married Wendy Kathleen Norman in 1960, both are Catholic. They had 5 children.

Lynch studied at the University of Edinburgh (MA, 1952), and at the University of London (Ph.D., 1955).  He served in the British Army after World War II from 1945-48. He then taught at the University of Liverpool (1954–61) and, since 1961 has been teaching at the University of London. He was the director for the Institute of Latin American Studies at the University of London from 1974 until his retirement in 1987.

The scope of his work expanded over the years: from the River Plate area to Latin America as a whole; and from the 18th to the 19th centuries.

He died on 4 April 2018 at the age of 91.

Quotes 

"The profession of historian has greatly changed in recent years under the influence of social science and statistics. At a time when measurement and conceptualization are paramount, I consider that the historian still has a duty to be readable, not least outside of the profession and that the virtues of pragmatism, intuition, and a sense of style are as important as ever." (Contemporary Authors, v. 85-88, p. 363. Detroit, 1980)
"I first became interested in Latin American history out of ignorance and curiosity, eager to discover a new world of sources and events. Since then I have tried to remove a few academic blind spots in Britain by teaching and writing in this field, and also to contribute the view of an outsider to Latin Americans. It is a matter of particular pleasure not only that I have been invited to lecture in their countries but that my books have been translated into Spanish and received a sympathetic reception in the Hispanic world. It is a challenging world, though the challenge for the historian is a limited one. The historian would not claim to resolve the problems of the present, only to reveal the past that lies behind the present.” (Contemporary Authors, v. 85-88, p. 363. Detroit, 1980)

Books 

 Spanish Colonial Administration, 1782-1810 (Athlone Press 1958) 
 Spanish Colonial Administration 1782-1810: The Intendant System in the Viceroyalty of the Rio De La Plata (New York 1958)
 Spain under the Habsburgs (Oxford 1964)
 Spain under the Habsburgs vol. I and II co-author R. A. Humphreys (Oxford 1969)
 The Origins of Latin American Revolutions 1808-1826 (Norton 1973)
 Argentine Caudillo: Juan Manuel de Rosas (Oxford 1980)
 The Spanish American Revolutions 1808-1826 (New York 1986)
 Bourbon Spain, 1700-1808 (Oxford 1989)
 Caudillos in Spanish America, 1800-1850 (Oxford 1992)
 Spain, 1516-1598: from nation state to world empire (Oxford 1992)
 The Hispanic world in crisis and change, 1598-1700 (Oxford 1992)
 Massacre in the Pampas, 1872: Britain and Argentina in the age of migration (Oklahoma 1998)
 Simon Bolivar: A Life (New Haven 2006)
 San Martin: Argentine Soldier, American Hero (New Haven 2009)
 New Worlds: A Religious History of Latin America (Palgrave 2012)''

Notes

1927 births
2018 deaths
British historians
British Hispanists
Historians of Latin America
Latin Americanists
Historians of Spain
Alumni of the University of Edinburgh
Alumni of the University of London
Academics of the University of Liverpool
Academics of University College London
People from The Boldons